Kökez can refer to:

 Kökez, Aladağ
 Kökez, Burdur
 Kökez, Eskil
 Kökez, Kıbrıscık